Eugene Pintard Bicknell (September 23, 1859 – February 9, 1925) was an American botanist and ornithologist.

Bicknell was born at Riverdale-on-Hudson, the sixth son of Maria Theresa Pierrepont and Joseph Inglis Bicknell. The family was descended on the paternal side from settlers who moved from England in 1635 and on the maternal side from Sir Robert de Pierrepont who served William the Conqueror before settling in America in 1640. Another relative, Reverend James Pierrepont of New Haven had donated his books to form the nucleus of the Yale College Library.

Bicknell studied at home and worked with the banking firm John Munroe & Co. He married Edith Babcock in 1901 at Riverdale and they had two daughters. They then moved to Long Island. He was interested in natural history from an early age. He wrote an article on the birds of the Hudson Valley in 1878 and in 1882 he wrote about the birds of the Catskill mountains in the bulletin of the Nuttall Ornithological Club. He collected a specimen of a thrush that was described by Ridgway and named as Bicknell's Thrush. He served as a secretary to the American Ornithologists' Union upon its founding and was a member of the Torrey Botanical Club, the New York Botanical Garden and other societies. He published more on plants and discovered several new species. Some of the species were found right in New York and local observers had never noticed the fine differences that Bicknell noted. He noted that there were two species of Helianthemum with a difference that had not been noticed before. This was followed by more species in the genera Sanicula, Sisyrinchium, Scrophularia, and Agrimonia. 
Bicknell's works include Review of the Summer Birds of Part of the Catskill Mountains (1882) and The Ferns and Flowering Plants of Nantucket (1908–19).

He died at his home in Hewlett, Long Island on February 9, 1925. His plant collections were gifted by his wife to the New York Botanical Garden.

Named in Bicknell's honor 
He is commemorated in the names of a number of plants and animals;

Plants
According to International Plant Names Index, there are at least 7 plants are named in honour of Eugene Pintard Bicknell (as bicknellii )

Carex bicknellii  
Crataegus bicknellii  
Crocanthemum bicknellii  
Geranium bicknellii , Bicknell's cranesbill 
Panicum bicknellii

Animals
Catharus bicknelli  Bicknell's thrush

References

American botanists
1859 births
1925 deaths
American ornithologists